Taies Farzan is an Iranian-German film actress who was born in Iran and thereafter moved to Germany with her parents at early age of 14. She started acting on stage for some years until she started acting in films of Daryush Shokof in late nineties. Her performance in the film Hitler's Grave by Daryush Shokof won her best acting award at the New York International Independent Film and Video Festival in 2011. She became active also as a film producer with Tenussian Vaccuvasco and continued producing several low budget art films including Breathful and Hitler's Grave.

Films

 Breathful
 Hitler's Grave
 Chaplin of the Mountains

External links

Living people
German film actresses
People from Tehran
Year of birth missing (living people)
German people of Iranian descent